Issam Nima (born 8 April 1979 in El Biar, Alger) is an Algerian long jumper. His personal best long jump is 8.26 metres, achieved in July 2007 in Zaragoza which stands as the Algerian record as of today.  He has also competed in the triple jump, appearing in this event at the 2012 Summer Olympics without reaching the final.  His personal best in the triple jump is 16.89 metres achieve in Prague in 2012.

Competition record

References

External links

1979 births
Living people
Algerian male long jumpers
Algerian male triple jumpers
People from El Biar
Athletes (track and field) at the 2012 Summer Olympics
Olympic athletes of Algeria
African Games silver medalists for Algeria
African Games medalists in athletics (track and field)
Universiade medalists in athletics (track and field)
Athletes (track and field) at the 2005 Mediterranean Games
Athletes (track and field) at the 2009 Mediterranean Games
Mediterranean Games silver medalists for Algeria
World Athletics Championships athletes for Algeria
Mediterranean Games medalists in athletics
Athletes (track and field) at the 2007 All-Africa Games
Athletes (track and field) at the 2011 All-Africa Games
Universiade silver medalists for Algeria
Medalists at the 2005 Summer Universiade
21st-century Algerian people
20th-century Algerian people